Scratches of Spain is an album by English experimental jazz guitarist and bandleader Billy Jenkins, featuring the Voice of God Collective. It was released on the Babel Records label in 1987.

As with many of Jenkins' records, Scratches of Spain showcases Jenkins' "spaß jazz" approach which combines serious musicianship with conceptual irreverence, musical jokes and détournement. This is reflected in the album title (which refers to the classic Miles Davis album Sketches of Spain, with the cover art also being a parody of the Sketches of Spain artwork), the piece titles (which refer to down-to-earth, mass culture or tourism-related topics rather than the grander romantic conceptions featured on Sketches of Spain) and in the musician credits (which make jokey reference to the stylistic and technical approaches used by each player).

Track listing
All compositions by Billy Jenkins.

 "Monkey Men" – 6:15 
 "Cuttlefish" – 6:09 
 "Barcelona" – 7:57 
 "Benidorm Motorway Services" – 4:00 
 "Bilbao/St. Columbus Day" – 4:51 
 "Cooking Oil" – 5:12
 "McDonalds" – 4:41

Personnel
Billy Jenkins - "spaß" guitar, violin 
Chris Batchelor - "straight" trumpet 
John Eacott - "trad" trumpet  
Skid Solo - "spaß" trumpet 
Iain Ballamy - "bigtime" saxophones 
Steve Buckley - "straight" saxophones
Dai Pritchard - "spaß" saxophones, clarinets 
David Jago - "grown-up" trombone 
Ashley Slater - "juvenile" bass trombone, tuba, vocals
Davo Cooke - "heavy metal" guitar 
Django Bates - "doodle" keyboards 
Jimmy Haycraft - "golden" vibraphone 
Jo Westcott - "proper" cello 
Tim Matthewman - "fat" electric bass guitar 
Simon Edwards - "skinny" acoustic bass guitar 
Dawson - "experienced" hand drums, percussion,  
Steve Argüelles - "stuntman" hand drums, "midget" drumkit
Roy Dodds - excited percussion, "spaßtic" drumkit

References

1987 albums
Billy Jenkins (musician) albums